Nowhere Man is an American mystery science fiction thriller television series that aired on UPN on Monday nights from August 28, 1995, to May 20, 1996, starring Bruce Greenwood. The series was created by Lawrence Hertzog. Despite critical acclaim, including TV Guides label of "This season's coolest hit," the show was cancelled after one season. Reruns later aired in the early 2000s on Family Channel in Canada.

Overview
Nowhere Man is the story of photojournalist Thomas Veil, who discovers that his life has been abruptly "erased": his friends claim not to know him, his wife claims not to recognize him and is living with another man. His ATM cards and credit cards no longer work. His best friend turns up dead. His private studio is now owned by someone else. His mother, recovering from a stroke, is incapable of confirming his existence. He is ejected from his favorite restaurant as a total lunatic. In the course of a single evening, every trace of Tom's identity is gone.

Tom believes this is a conspiracy related to a photograph he took a year earlier, depicting four men being hanged in South America by what appear to be US soldiers. The only evidence Tom has of his past are the negatives of that photograph. A mysterious organization covertly pursues Tom in search of the negatives. The series revolves around Veil's attempts to get his life back by trying to find out more about the organization, while also trying to keep the negative safe.

In the final episode, "Gemini", it is revealed that Tom had been captured by the organization prior to the events of the series' first episode, and that all his memories of his life, including his marriage and even his name, had been implanted as part of a brainwashing experiment known as Project Marathon. He learns that he is actually a covert government operative codenamed "Gemini", and is part of a secret task force called "Heritage House", which was formed to investigate the organization and Project Marathon. He also learns that his copy of the "Hidden Agenda" photograph, as well as his memories of having taken it, have been altered, and that the original negative shows that the four men being lynched are actually U.S. senators being murdered by the organization.

Tom finds out the negative "Hidden Agenda" photograph is not real and the whole thing was a set-up. He questions the "number two man at the FBI" at gunpoint, but the man kills himself rather than risk revealing information under torture. The series ends with Tom watching a videotape that had been in the FBI man's possession, a film that finally explains everything; it shows "Tom" sitting in a chair under the influence being brainwashed into believing he is "Thomas Veil" and the life he has been living.

Production 
Although the main character travels from city to city across the United States in search of clues about the conspiracy, exteriors on the show were filmed in Portland, Oregon.  Many local landmarks can be seen in the background of various shots.  Series creator Larry Hertzog has acknowledged the influence of The Prisoner and The Fugitive in the show's themes. Resemblances can also be seen to The Manchurian Candidate, North by Northwest, 12 Monkeys, Three Days of the Condor, The X-Files and the 1967 television series Coronet Blue.

Recurring cast
Megan Gallagher as Alyson Veil (4 episodes)
Murray Rubinstein as Larry (2 episodes)
Mary Gregory as Mrs. Veil (2 episodes)
Jay Arlen Jones as Joe 'J. C.' Carter/Dr. Novik (2 episodes)

Episodes

Home media
Image Entertainment (under license from ABC) released Nowhere Man: The Complete Series on DVD in Region 1 on December 27, 2005.

References

External links

 

1995 American television series debuts
1996 American television series endings
1990s American mystery television series
1990s American science fiction television series
American thriller television series
English-language television shows
Fiction about mind control
Television series by ABC Studios
Television shows filmed in Oregon
UPN original programming